The Scharnberg House is a historic site in Clewiston, Florida. It is located at 325 East Del Monte Avenue. On April 26, 1999, it was added to the U.S. National Register of Historic Places. The building was designed by Clark J. Lawrence, a West Palm Beach architect, and was built in 1927.  According to Florida's Division of Historical Resources factsheet: "J.B. Scharnberg was a German born engineer and inventor who worked for the United States Sugar Corporation and held numerous patents for machinery innovations. Scharnberg occupied the house from 1931 to his death in 1940. At the time of his death Scharberg had developed the largest, most advanced sugar grinding mill in the world."

References

External links

 Hendry County listings, nationalregisterofhistoricplaces.com

Houses in Hendry County, Florida
Houses on the National Register of Historic Places in Florida
National Register of Historic Places in Hendry County, Florida
1927 establishments in Florida
Houses completed in 1927